Olli Haikka (born 4 June 1966) is the CEO of Yellow Film & TV corporation and an executive producer.

Haikka has been the CEO and executive producer of Yellow Film & TV since 2008. Haikka was the COO of Oy Filmiteollisuus Fine before the company was merged into Yellow Film & TV Oy. Oy Filmiteollisuus Fine is nowadays an auxiliary business name for Yellow Film & TV.

Yellow Film & TV is a Finnish production company. It is the Nordic region's largest independent production company with over 20 years of experience. They specialize in scripted TV production, high quality movies, drama, comedy, entertainment and sports.

Haikka has won multiple Venla-awards, Telvis-awards and Media & Message -awards. He has also received People's choice -award Jussi in 2006 for Tyttö sinä olet tähti -movie.

Haikka has been the executive producer in Lapland Odysses -movies, Downshifters-series, Antti Holma show, Roba and 1001 Rikua -show.

He has also been a producer or an executive producer in numerous other films such as Young Gods (film) (2003), Kukkia ja sidontaa (2004), Beauty and the Bastard (2005), Saippuaprinssi (2006), The Emperor's Secret (2006), Ganes (2007), Tears of April (2008), Blackout (2008), Forbidden Fruit (2009), Pihalla (2009), Lapland Odyssey (2010), Risto (2011) and Härmä (2012).

References

External links
 

Living people
1966 births
Finnish business executives
Finnish film producers
Finnish television producers